Hillsboro High School is a comprehensive high school in Nashville, Tennessee. Established in 1939, the school is one of fifteen high schools in Metropolitan Nashville Public Schools. The school offers the IB Diploma Programme.

History
Hillsboro High School officially opened October 22, 1939, with an enrollment of 164 students and seven faculty members. Initially, the school served a rural area. Later population increases, re-zoning, the Vocational Educational Act, and 20th century influences have resulted in changes from a two-story red brick building in a pastoral setting to a set of massive white buildings which were designed by nationally recognized architects. On October 31, 1952, the first school was destroyed by fire. Several renovations have occurred since the replacement of that building in the 1950s, most recently in 1995. The school is currently undergoing a renovation predicted for completion in 2020.

Extracurricular activities
Student groups and activities include anime club, badminton club, Burro Bookworms, Burro Unplugged, chorus, Close Up, concert band, creative writing club, eating disorder awareness, forensics, Future Business Leaders of America, gamer club, The Hillsboro Globe (newspaper), The Burro Underground (literary magazine), the Hillsboro Players drama troupe, Interact, International Teen Outreach Program, jazz band, Knit Wits, Latino club, learning center, mock trial, National Honor Society, National Conference for Community and Justice, Quiz Bowl, Saigon Children's Charity, student council, Team Hillsboro-Walk for the Cure, Women in Science, youth legislature (Youth in Government and Model United Nations), and HHS Habitat for Humanity.

Athletics
The Hillsboro athletic teams, known as the Burros, compete in baseball, basketball, bowling, cheerleading, cross country, football, golf, ice hockey, lacrosse, marching band, soccer, softball, swimming, tennis, track, volleyball, and wrestling.

State championship titles held by the school:
Basketball, girls: 2009
Cross country: 1962 (individual)
Football: 2003, 2008
American General Mr. Football Lineman of the Year: 2000, 2001, 2003
Golf, boys': 1945 (team), 1972 (individual)
Tennis, girls': 1968 (team, singles and doubles)
Track, boys: 1962 (mile run), 1969 (mile run), 1979 (220-yard dash), 1980 (100-yard dash, 120-yard high hurdles, 220-yard dash, 440-yard relay, team champions), 1981 (100-meter dash, 200-meter dash), 1982 (1600-meter relay, 3200-meter relay, high jump, team champions), 1988 (220-yard dash),(440-meter relay),(880-meter relay) (800-meter run), 1989 (800-meter run), 1995 (200-meter dash), 1996 (300-meter low hurdles, 400-meter dash)
Track, girls: 1974 (long jump), 1999 (200-meter dash and long jump), 2001 (3200-meter relay), 2008 (100-meter dash)
Wrestling: 1995 (112 lb weight class)
Lacrosse, boys: 2021

Notable alumni
Thomas B. Allen, illustrator and painter
Red Grooms (Charles Rogers Grooms), an American multimedia artist; painter, sculptor, printmaker, filmmaker, and theatrical showman
Eddie Hill, former NFL running back
Kerry G. Johnson, graphic designer, caricaturist and humorous illustrator. His illustrations and cartoons have appeared in several newspapers, magazines, web sites and blogs. Creator of several fictional characters including the teen girl superhero, SPECTRA.
Harmony Korine, film director and screenwriter
 Wes Borland, guitarist for the band Limp Bizkit
John "Bucky" Wilkin, songwriter and musician of Ronny & the Daytonas fame
Mike Willis, former Major League Baseball player for the Toronto Blue Jays from 1977–1981
Carla Hall, chef, and Top Chef contestant
Brandon Heath, contemporary Christian musician and Singer-songwriter
 Shannon Sanders, Grammy award winning producer and songwriter.
 Tim Wise, author and anti-racism activist.
 Jim Sasser, U.S. Senator, 1977-1995; U.S. Ambassador to China, 1996-1999
 Bob Clement, U.S. Congressman, 1988-2003; Nashville Mayoral Candidate, 2007
 Isabelle Harrison, Phoenix Mercury and Tennessee forward

Former principals
Medford Bowman (1939–1941)
John Koen (1941–1964)
Hale Harris
Taylor Hagen
Dr. William Hicks
Dr. Jean Gray Litterer (1979–1999)
James Overstreet (1999–2003)
Robert (Bob) Lawson (2003–2007)
Roderick Manuel (2007–2010)
Dr. Terry Shrader (2010–2015)
Dr. Shuler Pelham (2015–Present)

References

Schools in Nashville, Tennessee
Educational institutions established in 1939
Public high schools in Tennessee
International Baccalaureate schools in Tennessee
1939 establishments in Tennessee